Kyung-hwa Choi-ahoi (Hangul: 경화 초이-아호이; born 1967 in Seoul) is a South Korean graphic artist, author and university teacher living in Germany, with a focus on drawing. From 2015 to 2019 she was a professor for drawing at the University of the Arts Bremen and has been a professor for drawing at the Weißensee Academy of Art Berlin since 2019. She lives in Hamburg and Berlin.

Life 

Choi-ahoi came to Germany in 1991 to attend University, first in Trier and Mainz, where she started with studies in art history, philosophy and Latin. In 1994 she changed universities as well as her major: Choi-ahoi enrolled in art classes at the University of Fine Arts of Hamburg with KP Brehmer, Werner Büttner and Fritz W. Kramer. Her last name is a pseudonym, a pun which plays with the status of the city of Hamburg as an important harbor city, because Hamburg became her first home in Germany. In 1998 she completed a stage design internship at the Thalia Theater in Hamburg in the production Blau in Blau (Blue in Blue), directed by Stefan Moskov. From 1999 to 2000 she spent a semester abroad on an Erasmus scholarship at the Academy of Fine Arts Vienna with Franz Graf.

In 2001, Choi-ahoi was awarded the Karl H. Ditze Prize in Hamburg for her diploma work. From 2001 to 2003, after graduating, she completed postgraduate studies with Werner Büttner. Since 2011, Choi-ahoi has been working as a university lecturer alongside her own artistic work, initially as a lecturer in drawing at the Hamburg University of Applied Sciences, Faculty of Design, Media and Information. In 2015 she accepted a professorship for drawing at the University of the Arts Bremen in the master studio of the School of Visual Combinations, which artistically combines the fields of typography, drawing, editorial design and publishing.

She is married to a former fellow student from her years at the University of Fine Arts in Hamburg, the Greek painter Nikos Valsamakis. She lives in Hamburg and Berlin.

Works 

Kyung-hwa Choi-ahoi's work combines the elements of drawing and recording to create an art form of its own. "From an early age, she combined drawings with poetic journaling—a practice she has continued to this day", wrote the German art historian Belinda Grace Gardner. "The diary drawings that have become her trademark have been emerging since the first semester, when she began to produce drawings on five to ten A4 sheets of paper every day."

Drawing projects 
In 1999 the idea was born to produce one or two diary drawings every day as part of a long-term project. In these diary pages she processes the encounter with poetic and everyday objects, events, people and things from her personal environment. To date she has created thousands of diary drawings, in 2021 their number counted already over 8000. Each drawing is typewritten and dated on the front. More than 200 diary drawings are part of the collection of the Hamburger Kunsthalle, where Kyung-hwa Choi-ahoi had her first solo exhibition in 2001 titled Fern und Nah (Far and Near).

Since 2000 she has also been working continuously on the drawing project Enzyklopädie Personae (Encyclopedia Personae), a drawn social history of her time. It contains quick sketches of people from her environment, whom she follows for a day – from getting up to going to bed – in a drawn documentation. In DIN A5 notebooks, she records how these people spend their day and writes down answers to personal questions. By 2021, more than seventy of these booklets had been created.

After a residency at Ritzebüttel Castle in Cuxhaven in 2013, she started to incorporate elements from nature and the plant world into her drawings, often in relation to parts of human anatomy. Between 2012 and 2014 she worked intensively on anatomical studies. Since then, dealing with the world of plants has found its way into the drawing project Garten (Garden).

Artist books 
In 1999, Choi-ahoi's first artistic book publication Buchstäbliche Zeichnung – Zeichnerische Buchstaben (Letteral Drawing – Drawing Letters) was published by the in-house Materialverlag of the Hamburg University of Fine Arts. Since then she has published other artist books, such as Lieber Geld (Rather/Dear Money), published in 2014, which the journalist Anna Brenken described as "a mosaic that is as curious as it is poetic". In it, Choi-ahoi proves her "invaluable talent for discovering the great world theater in a small form in everyday life". In the afterword to Von Hamburg nach Wien und zurück: Tag.Buch.Zeichnung 1999 und 2000 (From Hamburg to Vienna and back: Day.Book.Drawing 1999 and 2000), published by Textem Verlag in 2020, publisher Michael Glasmeier writes:

Awards and prizes 
 2001: Karl H. Ditze Prize
 2014: Sella Hasse Art Prize, Hamburg

Fellowships and residencies 
 2002: Fellowship Künstlerhäuser Worpswede
 2004: Hamburg Work Grant
 2004: Fellowships Künstlerhaus Lauenburg
 2005: Hans-Günther-Baass-Grant, Hamburg
 2005: Fellowship of Künstlerdorf Schöppingen
 2007: Fellowship Künstlerhaus Cismar Abbey
 2011: Art Residency in Bad Gastein
 2013: Fellowship at Künstlerhaus Schloss Ritzebüttel, Cuxhaven

Exhibitions (selection)

Solo exhibitions 
 2001: Fern und Nah, Hamburger Kunsthalle
 2003: himmelblau, Kunstverein Rügen
 2003: Pigment ohne Zucker, Art and Henle Gallery, Berlin
 2004: 20 December 2004, ProjecteSD Gallery, Barcelona
 2004: tag.buch.zeichnung, Gruppe Grün Gallery, Bremen
 2004: redwine from chile, Künstlerhaus Lauenburg
 2006: 18 March 2005, Künstlerhaus Hamburg
 2010: In Wort und Zeichnung, Kramer Fine Art Gallery, Hamburg
 2013: Heitere Tage, Kunstverein Schallstadt
 2014: Mutterkorn, Hengevoss-Dürkop Gallery, Hamburg
 2015: Augen äpfeln, Nasen blühn, Heine-Haus, Hamburg
 2020: Ovar, Hengevoss-Dürkop Gallery, Hamburg

Group exhibitions 
 1998: Knapp getroffen ist auch daneben, Kunstverein Kehdingen
 1999: Die Bücher der Künstler, Library of Academy of Fine Arts Vienna
 1999: Similar Grounds, Kampnagel KX, Hamburg
 1999: Kunst in der Börse, Handelskammer Hamburg
 2000: Nägel mit Zöpfen, Palais of Contemporary Art, Glückstadt (Palais für aktuelle Kunst Glückstadt)
 2004: Kunst in Hamburg. Heute, Hamburger Kunsthalle
 2004: Stipendiaten 2004, Westwerk, Hamburg
 2006: Kunst in Hamburg. Heute ll, Hamburger Kunsthalle
 2006: Lulea Sommer Biennale, Schweden
 2007: Unfair '07, Ileana Tounta Gallery, Athens
 2007: keine Zeichnung, kein Zeichner, Kunstverein Rügen
 2007: Particules libres – nouvelle, Cité internationale des arts Paris
 2008: Wir nennen es Hamburg, Kunstverein Hamburg
 2008: present perfekt / portraits, Martin Asbæk Projects Gallery, Copenhagen
 2010: Nominierter Index, Kunsthaus Hamburg
 2010: Da Hood II, Gängeviertel Hamburg
 2013: Zeichnung pur, Hengevoss-Dürkop Gallery, Hamburg
 2014: Chill Out!, Hengevoss-Dürkop Gallery, Hamburg
 2014: Bremer Kunstfrühling, site of the former freight yard (Güterbahnhof) Bremen
 2015: Erinnerung, Hengevoss-Dürkop Gallery, Hamburg
 2016: Hoehen Rausch, Eigen+Art Lab Gallery, Berlin
 2016: Literatur in den Häusern der Stadt, C15 Lohmann Collection, Hamburg
 2016: Nachbilder der Erinnerung, Frise Künstlerhaus Hamburg
 2017: La Cuisine Allmonde, Galerie du Tableau, Marseille
 2017: Künstlerbücher für Alles, Weserburg Museum für moderne Kunst Bremen
 2017: Eros, Hengevoss-Dürkop Gallery, Hamburg
 2017: Immer Ärger mit den Großeltern, Künstlerhaus Sootbörn und Kunsthaus Dresden
 2018: Stuttgart Sichten, Deichtorhallen Hamburg
2019: Envisioning America, Hengevoss-Dürkop Gallery, Hamburg
 2019: Aufenthaltswahrscheinlichkeiten, Flag Studio, Osaka
 2019: The Bangkok Triennale International Print and Drawing 5, Bangkok
 2020: Eye of Mobile, Onkaf Gallery, New Delhi

Publications 
 (1999) Buchstäbliche Zeichnung – Zeichnerische Buchstaben. Edition Zeichnung, Material 104. Hamburg: Materialverlag. . 
 (2008) Kunstraum Heidorf (ed.): Cook and People. Erinnerungen an eine Stadt. Hamburg: Strodehner Presse. . 
 (2010) Augenarzt und Uhrmacher. Hamburg: Textem Verlag. 
 (2014) Lieber Geld. Hamburg: Textem Verlag. . 
 (2020) Von Hamburg nach Wien und zurück: Tag.Buch.Zeichnung 1999 und 2000. Hamburg: Textem Verlag. . 
 (2021) Drawings in: Insa Härtel (ed.): Reibung und Reizung: Psychoanalyse, Kultur und deren Wissenschaft. Hamburg: Textem Verlag. .

Literature 
 (2011) von Goetz, Andrea (ed.): Kunstresidenz Bad Gastein – Stipendiaten 2011. Hamburg: VGS Art. . 
 (2020) Kramer, Fritz W.: Unter Künstlern. Erkundungen im Lerchenfeld. Bemerkungen zu werdenden Künstlern. Series: Campo. Hamburg: Textem Verlag. .

External links 

 
 Profile  Kunsthochschule Weißensee
 Works at Gallery Hengevoss-Dürkop, Hamburg

References

Living people
1967 births
Graphic artists
South Korean women artists
South Korean women academics
20th-century South Korean artists
21st-century South Korean artists
Academic staff of the University of the Arts Bremen
Academic staff of the Weißensee Academy of Art Berlin
Artists from Hamburg